Marmaduke is a city in Greene County, Arkansas, United States. The population was 1,111 in 2010.

History
The town of Marmaduke was named for Confederate Major General John Sappington Marmaduke, who later served as governor of Missouri. Marmaduke was said to have established a camp for his soldiers near the site of the present town. The Texas and St. Louis Railroad was built through the area in 1882.

Marmaduke was incorporated on August 2, 1909, and, by 1914, had expanded to include two drugstores, three banks, three restaurants, a Methodist and a Southern Baptist church, two barber shops, a hotel, a boarding house, and two dime stores. The primary employers at the time were a sawmill, a lumber mill, a stave mill, and large and cut timber distributors.

Current industry includes the Anchor plastics company and the American Railcar Company.

The community was severely damaged by a severe tornado on April 2, 2006. At least half of the town was reported to have been destroyed or even flattened, and nearly every structure received some degree of damage. No one was killed in Marmaduke, but at least 50 people were injured, some seriously. In 2009 a major ice storm came across the northern part of Arkansas, causing the village, together with other regions, to lose electricity for a few weeks. Since then the town has almost fully recovered.

Geography
Marmaduke is located in northeastern Greene County.  U.S. Route 49 passes through the center of Marmaduke, leading northeast  to Piggott and southwest  to Paragould, the Greene County seat. Arkansas Highway 34 crosses US 49 in the center of town; it leads east  to Arkansas Highway 139 at Fritz and west  to Lafe.

Marmaduke is in the northern part of the Arkansas Delta physical region and sits just east of Crowley's Ridge.

Demographics

2020 census

As of the 2020 United States census, there were 1,212 people, 496 households, and 358 families residing in the city.

2010 census
As of the 2010 United States Census, there were 1,111 people living in the city. The racial makeup of the city was 96.5% White, 0.1% Native American, 0.1% Asian and 1.6% from two or more races. 1.7% were Hispanic or Latino of any race.

2000 census
As of the census of 2000, there were 1,158 people, 487 households, and 323 families living in the city. The racial makeup of the city was 96.80% White, 0.43% Native American, 0.09% Asian, 0.52% from other races, and 2.16% from two or more races.  0.78% of the population were Hispanic or Latino of any race.

There were 487 households, out of which 32.4% had children under the age of 18 living with them, 53.2% were married couples living together, 10.5% had a female householder with no husband present, and 33.5% were non-families. 30.0% of all households were made up of individuals, and 16.4% had someone living alone who was 65 years of age or older.  The average household size was 2.34 and the average family size was 2.93.

In the city, the population was spread out, with 25.2% under the age of 18, 7.7% from 18 to 24, 28.1% from 25 to 44, 22.5% from 45 to 64, and 16.6% who were 65 years of age or older.  The median age was 36 years. For every 100 females, there were 85.6 males.  For every 100 females age 18 and over, there were 84.3 males.

The median income for a household in the city was $23,300, and the median income for a family was $31,016. Males had a median income of $23,375 versus $19,432 for females. The per capita income for the city was $11,506.  About 18.1% of families and 20.4% of the population were below the poverty line, including 24.8% of those under age 18 and 19.7% of those age 65 or over.

Education
Public education for elementary and secondary schools is provided by the Marmaduke School District, which leads to graduation from Marmaduke High School.

References

External links

City of Marmaduke official website

Cities in Arkansas
Cities in Greene County, Arkansas
Populated places established in 1909
1909 establishments in Arkansas